The Durme is a 23.8 km river in Belgium. The left tributary of the Scheldt, it is created by the confluence of the Zuidlede and the Moervaart near Daknam, Lokeren. It passes through Lokeren, Waasmunster and borders Zele, it merges in the Scheldt at Tielrode (Temse), where it forms the border between Hamme and Temse.

Rivers of Belgium
Rivers of East Flanders